The Kauffmann olefination is a chemical reaction to convert aldehydes and ketones to olefins with a terminal methylene group. This reaction was discovered by the German chemist Thomas Kauffmann and is related to the better known Tebbe olefination or Wittig reaction.

Formation of the reagent 
The reagent was generated in situ by conversion of different halogenides of molybdenum or tungsten with methyllithium at low temperatures (−78 °C).

During the warm-up process the formation of the active reagent occurs. NMR-experiments have shown that the active reagent is not a Schrock carbene (e.g. Tebbe-reagent).

Mechanism 

Mechanism experiments shows that the olefination process is a sequence of cycloaddition and cycloelimination steps.

Applications 
For a long time this reaction had no applications in the synthetic organic chemistry. In 2002 it was used in a total synthesis of the terpene gleenol as a mild and non-basic reagent. A one-pot-protocol with an olefin metathesis step with Grubbs catalyst is also available. It is remarkable that the organometallic catalyst tolerates the inorganic reaction products.

References 

Name reactions
Carbon-carbon bond forming reactions
Olefination reactions